Pedro Louis Zayas (born September 25, 1977), known as Peedi Crakk and Peedi Peedi, is an American rapper of Puerto Rican descent.  He is a member of State Property and is currently signed to Amalgam Digital and G-Unit Philly.

Career
The North Philly MC first signed to Roc-A-Fella Records in 2001 with the help of Freeway, a friend of Peedi since high school who had already joined the label through Beanie Sigel and his State Property entourage. In 2002, Peedi's Megahertz produced debut single, "One for Peedi Crakk", charted in the R&B/hip-hop Top 40. He continued to make appearances on various Roc-a-Fella albums, including Jay-Z's The Blueprint²: The Gift & the Curse and Freeway's Philadelphia Freeway. His guest appearances were usually standouts, and his mixtapes gave him a reputation among East Coast rap fans. Faced with increasing exposure, the Philly rapper decided to modify his rap name to Peedi Peedi.

However, in 2005, two problems greatly affected Peedi's career. State Property dissolved, and Roc-a-Fella Records formally split into two. Jay-Z remaining at Def Jam with 50 percent, and Roc-a-Fella co-founder Dame Dash taking the other 50 percent to Universal Records under his Dame Dash Music Group. Peedi refused to side with Sigel and Dame Dash, and was briefly a free agent until Jay-Z, who soon became the president of Def Jam and maintained the Roc-a-Fella catalogue at the label, signed him. Peedi began working on a debut album, Prince of the Roc, but it was continuously delayed.

In 2006, Peedi was featured on Game Theory, the first Def Jam release by fellow rap group The Roots, on its single "Long Time".  Shortly afterwards, Roots drummer and leader ?uestlove offered Peedi a provisional spot with the group. Peedi stated he would welcome the chance to join The Roots. The one single for his shelved album, "Take Me Home," was released in 2007. Peedi became at odds with the label over his album, and tensions developed between him and Jay-Z. Peedi decided to lash out against the executive/rapper in the press and leaked several Jay-Z diss tracks, before he was released from his contract in 2008. Peedi then signed with Internet-based label Amalgam Digital, where he planned the release of album titled Camel Face Hunting Season for September 2008 ; rather than released, his record was renamed and pushed back. Originally planning his debut album, A Night in the Life, for March 24, it was later pushed back to May 2009. It now has no known release date.

Discography

Albums
Crakk Files Vol. 1 (2004)
Crakk Files Vol. 2 (2006)
Crakk Files Vol. 3 (2007)
Torture Crakk Is Bakk (2007)
Prince of the Roc (Unreleased) (2007)
Welcome to Crakk's House (2008)
A Night in the Life (Unreleased) (2009)
Crakk Files Vol. 4 (2011)
CF5: The Cocaine Edition (2013)
Crime Partners (2017)

Singles

Solo

As featured artist

References

External links
 Extensive audio interview on public radio program The Sound of Young America
Peedi Crack on Myspace

1977 births
American male rappers
American people of Puerto Rican descent
Living people
Rappers from Philadelphia
Roc-A-Fella Records artists
21st-century American rappers
21st-century American male musicians